The water polo tournament at the 1984 Summer Olympics was held from 1 to 10 August 1984, at the Raleigh Runnels Memorial Pool in Malibu, California. The tournament featured 12 teams, playing two rounds of round-robin play: preliminaries and finals.

Water polo was one of four Aquatics sports held at the 1984 Games, along with swimming, diving, and synchronized swimming, which was held for the first time.

Qualification

Teams
12 teams played in the 1984 Olympic tournament:

The top 8 teams qualified for the 1985 FINA Men's Water Polo World Cup in Duisburg, West Germany.

Squads

Tournament play
The tournament was set up into 2 levels of round-robin play: preliminary play in 3 groups; and final play in 2 groups. The top 2 teams from each preliminary group (shaded ones) advanced to Group D and played for the top-6 places; the bottom 2 teams from each preliminary group played in Group E to determine places 7-12.

Preliminary round

Group A

1 August

2 August

3 August

Group B

1 August

2 August

3 August

Group C

1 August

2 August

3 August

Final round

Group D

6 August

7 August

9 August

10 August

Group E

6 August

7 August

9 August

10 August

Final ranking

Medalists

Top goalscorers

See also
Water polo at the 1982 World Aquatics Championships – Men's tournament
Water polo at the 1986 World Aquatics Championships – Men's tournament
Water polo at the Friendship Games

References

Sources
 PDF documents in the LA84 Foundation Digital Library:
 Official Report of the 1984 Olympic Games, v.2 (download, archive) (pp. 528–534)
 Water polo on the Olympedia website
 Water polo at the 1984 Summer Olympics (men's tournament)
 Water polo on the Sports Reference website
 Water polo at the 1984 Summer Games (men's tournament) (archived)

 
1984 Summer Olympics events
O
1984
1984
Sports in Malibu, California